Flora was built in 1798 at Yarmouth. She was captured early in her career and quickly recaptured. She traded to the Mediterranean and the Bahamas. She was last listed in 1813.

Career
Flora first appeared in Lloyd's Register  (LR) in 1799. In 1799 she had already made a voyage to Barbados and Jamaica and back.

On 19 September 1799 Flora, Ferguson, master, sailed for the Cape. On 23 September she was off Folkestone when a French privateer captured her. The privateer took her into Boulogne. She had been carrying a vast number of letters for the troops at the Cape. A British warship cut her out of Boulogne and Flora returned to London, her voyage having been aborted. Her entry in the 1800 issue of LR carried the annotation "captured", but crossed out.

Flora, Evans, master, from Plymouth, went on shore in Apple Bay, near Margate on 4 March 1802, but got off without any material damage, except for the loss of an anchor and cable.

Fate
Flora was last listed in 1813.

Citations

References
 

1798 ships
Age of Sail merchant ships of England
Captured ships